The subhumid temperate climate also called monsoon temperate climate,  is a temperate climate sub-type with monsoon influence, that is a climate with dry winter and wet summer. Although the terms subhumid temperate climate and monsoon temperate climate are not officially used in the Köppen climate classification, climates of this type may fall under the Cw classification for dry winters. In most cases it may be present as highland climate.

This climate depend of Intertropical Convergence Zone fluctuations which leads humidity and warm to each hemisphere.

Sub-types

Monsoon subtropical climate
A Monsoon subtropical climate, officially classified as a Subhumid subtropical climate or Monsoon-influenced humid subtropical climate under the Köppen classification (Cwa), has strong seasonality with hot summer. It is influenced by tropical climates, mainly the savanna climate Aw. Very extended in South and Southeast Asia mainly India, Myanmar,  and Nepal and Southern Africa, Zambia and Angola. Can also be found in South America, isolated zones of Bolivia, Brazil and Argentina. Occurs in parts of tropical highlands of São Paulo state, Mato Grosso do Sul and near the Andean highland in northwestern Argentina. These highland areas feature summer temperatures that are warm enough to fall outside the subtropical highland climate category Cfa.

Highland subhumid temperate climate
A Highland subhumid temperate climate, officially classified as a Subtropical highland climate or Monsoon-influenced temperate oceanic climate under the Köppen classification (Cwb), only exists in elevated portions of the world that are within either the tropics or subtropics, though it is typically found in mountainous locations in some tropical countries. Despite the latitude, the higher altitudes of these regions mean that the climate tends to share characteristics with oceanic climates, though it can experience noticeably drier weather during the lower-sun "winter" season, and it usually has warmer winters than most oceanic climates.

Subpolar subhumid temperate climate
A Subpolar subhumid temperate climate, officially classified as a Cold subtropical highland climate or Monsoon-influenced subpolar oceanic climate under the Köppen classification (Cwc), is a sub-alpine climate. Located only in Andean high plains in Bolivia and Perú, from 3200 m until 4000 m. It is a transition climate between Cwb and alpine climate ETH.

See also
 Humid temperate climate
 Mediterranean climate
 Temperate climate
 Köppen climate

References

Climate and weather classification systems